Tbilissky District is an administrative district (raion), one of the thirty-eight in Krasnodar Krai, Russia. As a municipal division, it is incorporated as Tbilissky Municipal District. It is located in the eastern central part of the krai. 

Its administrative center is the rural locality (a stanitsa) of Tbilisskaya. 

Population:  The population of Tbilisskaya accounts for 52.2% of the district's total population.

References

Notes

Sources

Districts of Krasnodar Krai